The 2015 Elon Phoenix men's soccer team represented Elon University during the 2015 NCAA Division I men's soccer season. It was the 44th season of the university fielding a program, and the 13th season in NCAA Division I competition. It was the program's second season with Chris Little as head coach. Little, the sixth head coach in program history, formerly coached the Carolina Dynamo of the Premier Development League before assuming his current role at Elon. On 12 September 2015, the Phoenix defeated in-state rival Davidson 4-0 to achieve its best start in school history (5-0-0). On 22 September 2015, the team recorded a school record #8 ranking by the NSCAA after mid-week victories over #7 Wake Forest and CAA opponent Drexel. Those wins improved their record to 7-0-0, thus extending the program's record start to seven wins.

Roster 

As of 2015:

Schedule 

|-
!colspan=6 style="background:#800000; color:#CFB53B;"| Preseason
|-

|-
!colspan=6 style="background:#800000; color:#CFB53B;"| Regular season
|-

|-
!colspan=6 style="background:#800000; color:#CFB53B;"| CAA Tournament
|-

|-
!colspan=6 style="background:#800000; color:#CFB53B;"| NCAA Tournament
|-

|-

See also 

 Elon Phoenix men's soccer
 2015 Colonial Athletic Association men's soccer season
 2015 NCAA Division I men's soccer season
 2015 CAA Men's Soccer Tournament
 2015 NCAA Division I Men's Soccer Championship

References 

Elon Phoenix men's soccer seasons
2015 Colonial Athletic Association men's soccer season
Elon